The 2005 South Australian Soccer Federation season was the 99th season of soccer in South Australia, and the final under the SASF format.

2005 SASF Premier League

The 2005 South Australian Premier League was the final season of the SASF Premier League, the top level domestic association football competition in South Australia. It was contested by 12 teams in a single 22 round league format, each team playing all of their opponents twice.

Finals

2005 SASF State League

The 2005 South Australian State League was the final season of the SASF State League, as the second highest domestic level association football competition in South Australia. It was contested by 12 teams in a single 22 round league format, each team playing all of their opponents twice.

Finals

See also
2005 SASF Premier League
2005 SASF State League
National Premier Leagues South Australia
Football Federation South Australia

References

2005 in Australian soccer
Football South Australia seasons